Parker C. Messick (born October 26, 2000) is an American baseball pitcher in the Cleveland Guardians organization. He played college baseball for the Florida State Seminoles.

Amateur career
Messick grew up in Plant City, Florida where he attended Plant City High School. He won the Wade Boggs Athletic Achievement Award during his junior year after batting .298 with four home runs as a first baseman and going 6-3 with a 1.58 ERA and 45 strikeouts as a pitcher. As a senior, Messick struck out a state-leading 125 batters with an 11-1 record and a 1.06 ERA over 86 innings and was named Florida Mr. Baseball.

Messick went 1–1 with one save and a 0.77 ERA and struck out 19 batters in  innings over six relief appearances during his true freshman season before it was cut short due to the coronavirus pandemic. After the season, he played collegiate summer baseball for the Winter Garden Squeeze of the Florida Collegiate Summer League. Messick won the league's Cy Young Award after going 3-0 with a 0.49 ERA and striking out 27 batters against five hits and three walks in  innings pitched. As a redshirt freshman, Messick posted a 8-2 record with 126 strikeouts and a 3.10 ERA in 90 innings pitched and was named the Atlantic Coast Conference (ACC) Freshman of the Year, the Atlantic Coast Conference Baseball Pitcher of the Year, first team All-ACC, and a third team All-American by Collegiate Baseball and the National Collegiate Baseball Writers Association. He was also occasionally used as a designated hitter and batted .225 with one home run, which he hit in his first collegiate plate appearance, and five RBIs in 40 at-bats. During the summer of 2021 Messick was named to USA Baseball's Collegiate National Team (CNT), where 46 of the Nations best teamed up to play an 11 game series (Stars versus Stripes) throughout the Appalachian League venues and a 3 game series with USA's Olympic National Team. He was again named the Seminoles' Friday night starter going into his redshirt sophomore season. Messick was also named to the watchlist for the Golden Spikes Award and the Preseason Pitcher of the Year by Perfect Game USA.

Professional career
Messick was selected by the Cleveland Guardians in the second round with the 54th overall selection in the 2022 Major League Baseball draft. He signed with the team on July 30, 2022, and received a signing bonus of $1.3 million.

References

External links

Florida State Seminoles bio

2000 births
Living people
People from Plant City, Florida
Baseball players from Florida
Baseball pitchers
Florida State Seminoles baseball players